A Thin Line Between Love and Hate is a 1996 American comedy thriller film. It tells the story of Darnell Wright (Martin Lawrence), a ladies' man who finds himself stalked by one of his obsessed lovers: Brandi (Lynn Whitfield), an attractive and successful, but unstable older businesswoman.

Lawrence directed the film, and co-wrote the screenplay alongside Kenny Buford, Bentley Kyle Evans and Kim Bass. Released on April 3, 1996, the film grossed over $34 million at the box office against a budget of $8 million.

Plot
Nightclub manager Darnell Wright is a perpetual playboy and hopeless male chauvinist. He works for a nightclub called Chocolate City and aspires to be its owner. He trades VIP privileges at the club for favors from women. Though he is an expert at conning women, he sometimes worries about what his childhood sweetheart Mia thinks of his adventures.

When the beautiful and wealthy Brandi Web steps out of a limousine to enter the club, Darnell feels that he's met his ultimate prize. 

She initially rejects his come-ons, which only fuels his appetite. He pursues her, showing up with flowers at her office. He finally wins over Brandi, only to find out that he's really in love with Mia. 

One morning, Darnell awakes to find Brandi in his kitchen making bacon and pancakes. She wants him to hold her, but he pushes her off aggressively. However, Brandi doesn't take kindly to rejection. She becomes an obsessed femme fatale: stalking him, taking all four wheels off his SUV to ground him from his rounds, shattering his windshield, and setting his nightclub on fire. She hits herself with a fruit-stuffed stocking to cause herself bruises without fingerprints, and repeatedly slams a door on her arm injuring herself. 

When Darnell goes to see her at the hospital, he is arrested for a false domestic violence charge. She then threatens Mia's life.

Ending his relationship with Mia is not enough to satisfy Brandi who finally administers Darnell's punishment for his misogyny. Darnell quickly learns the hard way that if you "play", you have to "pay."  

Darnell, now suffering from a gun wound attempts to take the gun from Brandi, causing Brandi, Mia, and he to fall out of a window and land in a  pool. 

Darnell awakes from the fall in a hospital, with all his friends, family, and Mia standing over him.  He decides to change his life for the better. Brandi is arrested and imprisoned.

Cast
 Martin Lawrence as Darnell Wright 
 Lynn Whitfield as Brandi Web
 Regina King as Mia Williams
 Bobby Brown as "Tee"
 Della Reese as Mama Wright
 Malinda Williams as Erica Wright
 Daryl Mitchell as Earl
 Roger E. Mosley as Smitty
 Simbi Khali as Adrienne
 Tangie Ambrose as Nikki
 Wendy Raquel Robinson as Gwen
 Stacii Jae Johnson as "Peaches"
 Miguel A. Núñez Jr. as Reggie
 Faizon Love as Manny
 Michael Bell as Marvis
 Michael Taliferro as Club Security
 Tiny Lister as Tyrone
 Tracy Morgan as Sean, The Bartender

Style
The plot of A Thin Line Between Love and Hate was influenced by Boomerang and Fatal Attraction. The opening sequence, depicting Darnell lying unconscious and fully clothed face down in a swimming pool while narrating the events that led him to there, was influenced by Billy Wilder's 1950 film Sunset Boulevard. The film has been classified as a comedy thriller.

Reception
A Thin Line Between Love and Hate grossed $34,873,513 at the box office against a budget of $8 million.

The critical reception of the film was mostly negative. On Rotten Tomatoes the film has a 15% rating based on 27 reviews.

Soundtrack

A soundtrack containing hip hop and R&B music was released on January 30, 1996, by Warner Bros. Records. It peaked at No. 22 on the Billboard 200 and No. 5 on the Top R&B/Hip-Hop Albums. It consisted of a blend of hip hop and R&B music. The soundtrack contained three charting singles, "Beware of My Crew", "A Thin Line Between Love and Hate" and "Let's Stay Together". On most releases of the soundtrack, Track 16 ("Brown Sugar" by D’Angelo) is omitted from the soundtrack altogether, leaving only a total of 15 tracks.

 "Beware of My Crew" - 4:30 (LBC Crew featuring Tray Deee & South Sentrelle)
 "A Thin Line Between Love and Hate" - 4:50 (H-Town featuring Shirley Murdock & Roger Troutman)
 "Damned If I Do" - 3:54 (Somethin' for the People featuring Adina Howard)
 "Freak Tonight" - 3:57 (R. Kelly)
 "I Don't Hang" - 4:58 (Soopafly)
 "Love Got My Mind Trippin'" - 3:30 (Ganjah K)
 "Ring My Bell" - 4:20 (Luniz)
 "Playa fo Real" - 4:15 (Dru Down)
 "Chocolate City" - 4:39 (Roger Troutman featuring Shirley Murdock)
 "Thin Line" - 4:36 (Drawz)
 "It's Ladies Night at Chocolate City" - 3:49 (Dark Complexion)
 "Knocks Me Off My Feet" - 3:22 (Tevin Campbell)
 "Let's Stay Together" - 4:53 (Eric Benét)
 "Come Over" - 5:15 (Sandra St. Victor)
 "Way Back When" - 4:28 (Smooth)
 ”Brown Sugar”  - 4:23 (D’Angelo)

Personnel

 Dwayne – producer
 Dave Aron – engineer
 Arvel – programming
 Alison Ball-Gabriel – director, executive producer
 Battlecat – multi instruments, producer
 Eric Benét – vocals, producer
 Chris Brickley – engineer, assistant engineer
 Priest Brooks – keyboards, producer
 Denise Brown – executive producer
 Larry Campbell – producer, mixing
 Tevin Campbell – vocals
 Cat Daddy Ro – programming
 Jon Catfish – keyboards, vocals
 D'Flow – producer
 Kevin "KD" Davis – mixing
 Michael Denten – engineer
 Michael Denton – engineer
 D'Flow Production Squad – producer
 DJ Battlecat – producer
 DJ Slip – engineer
 Dru Down – vocals
 Brian Frye – mixing assistant
 Fuzzy Da Lil' Nasty – vocals
 Brian Gardner – mastering
 Leigh Genniss – engineer, executive producer, mixing
 Stephen George – engineer, mixing
 Barry Hankerson – executive producer
 Yolanda Harris – vocals, backing vocals
 Lili Hayden – violin
 Tom Herzer – engineer
 Adina Howard – vocals
 D’Angelo - vocals
 L.T. Hutton – keyboards, producer
 George Jackson – executive producer
 Greg Jacobs – engineer
 Tim Kelley – drums, keyboards, producer, engineer
 R. Kelly – multi instruments, producer, engineer, mixing
 Vince Lars – saxophone
 Martin Lawrence – executive producer
 Bernard Lilton – arranger, keyboards, producer, vocal arrangement, moog bass
 Alex Lowe – assistant engineer, mixing assistant
 The Luniz – vocals
 Tim "Flash" Mariner – producer, engineer
 Doug McHenry – executive producer
 Aaron McInnes – assistant engineer
 Tony Mills – engineer
 Shirley Murdock – vocals
 George Nash, Jr. – guitar, producer, engineer
 Bill Ortiz – trumpet
 The Piano-Man – keyboards
 Demonté Posey – keyboards, producer, engineer
 Darin Prindle – engineer, mixing
 Steve Prudholme – director
 Timothy Christian Riley – piano, drums, electric piano
 Bob Robinson – keyboards, producer
 Sauce – programming, producer
 Michael Schlesinger – mixing
 Shock-G – arranger, drum programming
 Dexter Simmons – engineer
 Lance "Drawz" Simmons – vocal arrangement
 D.J. Slip – engineer
 Gary Smith – producer, drum programming
 John Jubu Smith – bass, guitar
 Snoop Dogg – keyboards, producer
 Somethin' for the People – producer
 Sandra St. Victor – arranger, vocals, producer
 Booker T – mixing
 Tim & Bob – producer
 Chris Trevett – mixing
 Lester Troutman – engineer
 Roger Troutman – bass, guitar, drums, keyboards, vocals, producer, talk box
 Joe Warlick – mixing assistant
 D'Wayne Wiggins – guitar
 Mike Wilson – assistant engineer, mixing assistant
 Mario Winans – drums

Certifications

References

External links
 
 

1996 films
1990s comedy thriller films
1990s English-language films
Films about stalking
American comedy thriller films
Films directed by Martin Lawrence
New Line Cinema films
Savoy Pictures films
1996 directorial debut films
1996 comedy films
1996 thriller films
1990s American films
African-American films